Calcium oxychloride may refer to:

 Calcium hypochlorite (Ca(OCl)2)
 Calcium hydroxychloride (CaOHCl2)